Emad Abdul-Ghani Sabouni (born 1964 in Damascus) is the former Minister of Communications and Technology of Syria.

Early life, education and career
Sabouni was born in Damascus in 1964. He earned a Ph.D. degree from National Polytechnic Institute of Grenoble, France. He also earned a degree in Engineering from Ecole Nationale Superieure des Télécommunications (Télécom Bretagne) in Brest, France.
 
Director General of the Syrian Telecommunications Establishment, 2003–2006. 
Chairman of the Syrian Computer Society. 
Advisor to Minister of Communications and Technology. 
Participated in composing the dictionary of Computer Terms published by the Syrian Computer Society. 
Member of the Technical Committee on Using the Arabic Language in Information Technology's Syrian Secretariat.
Participated in work teams at the Arab League, the International Telecommunication Union and the United Nations Economic and Social Commission for Western Asia (UN-ESCWA).

Personal life
Sabouni is married and has two daughters.

See also
Cabinet of Syria

References

Minister of Communications and Technology Emad Abdul-Ghani Sabouni, SANA
Biography of the new Syrian government 2011 - the names and lives of government ministers, Syria FM, 17 April 2011

External links
Ministry of Communications and Technology official government website

Syrian ministers of communication
Syrian engineers
Computer engineers
1964 births
Living people
Arab Socialist Ba'ath Party – Syria Region politicians
People from Damascus
Grenoble Institute of Technology alumni
20th-century engineers
21st-century engineers
21st-century Syrian politicians